Oleg Anatolyevich Sidorenkov (born 13 June 1976) is a Russian professional football coach and former player.

Coaching career
On 16 February 2019, Sidorenkov joined FC Sakhalin Yuzhno-Sakhalinsk as a youth coach.

References

External links
 
 Oleg Sidorenkov at Footballdatabase

1976 births
Living people
Russian footballers
Association football defenders
Russian expatriate footballers
Expatriate footballers in Belarus
Belarusian Premier League players
FC Naftan Novopolotsk players
FC Orsha players
FC Sheksna Cherepovets players
Russian football managers
Russian expatriate football managers
Expatriate football managers in Belarus
FC Naftan Novopolotsk managers
FC Dynamo Vologda players